The 1980–81 Football League season was Birmingham City Football Club's 78th in the Football League and their 46th in the First Division, to which they were promoted in 1979–80. They finished in 13th position in the 22-team division. They entered the 1980–81 FA Cup in the third round proper and lost to Coventry City in the fourth, and were eliminated in the quarter-final of the League Cup by Liverpool.

Twenty-three players made at least one appearance in nationally organised first-team competition, and there were eleven different goalscorers. Defenders Joe Gallagher and Dave Langan and midfielder Archie Gemmill each played in every game but one over the season, and Frank Worthington was the club's top scorer with 18 goals, of which 16 were scored in the league.

Football League First Division

League table (part)

FA Cup

League Cup

Appearances and goals

Numbers in parentheses denote appearances as substitute.
Players with name struck through and marked  left the club during the playing season.
Players with names in italics and marked * were on loan from another club for the whole of their season with Birmingham.

See also
Birmingham City F.C. seasons

References
General
 
 
 Source for match dates, league positions and results: 
 Source for lineups, appearances, goalscorers and attendances: Matthews (2010), Complete Record, pp. 396–97.

Specific

Birmingham City F.C. seasons
Birmingham City